Joseph E. Russell (April 4, 1864 – January 5, 1940) was an American farmer, teacher, and politician.

Russell was born in the town of Erin, Washington County, Wisconsin. He graduated from Whitewater Normal School and then taught school in Washington County. He was also a farmer and helped organized the cooperative cheese factory in Erin. Rusell was a livestock dealer and raised hogs and dairy cattle. He served as the Town of Erin clerk. Russell also served on the school board and was the board clerk. During World War I, Russell served on the Town of Erin Council of Defense. He served in the Wisconsin Assembly in 1933 and 1934 and was a Democrat. Russell died at his home in Erin, Wisconsin.

Notes

External links

1864 births
1940 deaths
People from Washington County, Wisconsin
University of Wisconsin–Whitewater alumni
Educators from Wisconsin
Farmers from Wisconsin
School board members in Wisconsin
Democratic Party members of the Wisconsin State Assembly